Ectomomyrmex is a ponerine genus of ants found in Asia and Australia. Little is known about their biology, but they seem to be generalist predators of arthropod prey.

Species

Ectomomyrmex aciculatus (Emery, 1901)
Ectomomyrmex acutus (Emery, 1900)
Ectomomyrmex aequalis Mann, 1919
Ectomomyrmex annamitus (André, 1892)
Ectomomyrmex apicalis (Smith, 1857)
Ectomomyrmex astutus (Smith, 1858)
Ectomomyrmex claudatus Menozzi, 1926
Ectomomyrmex exaratus (Emery, 1901)
Ectomomyrmex insulanus (Mayr, 1876)
Ectomomyrmex javanus Mayr, 1867
Ectomomyrmex leeuwenhoeki (Forel, 1886)
Ectomomyrmex lobocarenus (Xu, 1995)
Ectomomyrmex melancholicus (Smith, 1865)
Ectomomyrmex modiglianii Emery, 1900
Ectomomyrmex obtusus (Emery, 1900)
Ectomomyrmex overbecki Viehmeyer, 1916
Ectomomyrmex punctatus (Karavaiev, 1935)
Ectomomyrmex ruficornis Clark, 1934
Ectomomyrmex sauteri (Forel, 1912)
Ectomomyrmex scobinus Wilson, 1958
Ectomomyrmex simillimus (Donisthorpe, 1949)
Ectomomyrmex striatulus (Karavaiev, 1935)
Ectomomyrmex striolatus (Donisthorpe, 1933)
Ectomomyrmex sumatranus (Özdikmen, 2010)
Ectomomyrmex tonkinus (Santschi, 1920)
Ectomomyrmex vermiculatus (Emery, 1897)
Ectomomyrmex zhengi Xu, 1995

References

Ponerinae
Ant genera
Hymenoptera of Asia
Hymenoptera of Australia